TechCongress is a technology policy fellowship associated with the US Congress created by Travis Moore. Tech experts and professionals spend one year  with relevant Members or Committees in the House and Senate.  The fellowship's goal  is helping Congress aim for more informed decisions regarding technology and policy by allowing Congress to gain technical insight. At present, only 6 out of 15,000 staffers have a technical background.

Background 
Travis Moore founded the fellowship as a solution to some of the issues he witnessed in his six years of experience in the House of Representatives, working for former Rep. Henry A. Waxman (D-Calif.)

Logistics  
TechCongress used an Indiegogo campaign to get seed funding for the fellowship. A total sum of $8,000 was raised in the first year.

It invites a wide variety of individuals with different backgrounds to be part of the fellowship. Fellows mainly come from technical backgrounds, involving work in the private sector.

Fellows are placed into different governmental bodies. They  have a chance to work in the office of a member, committee, or a congressional support agency. Participants receive an $82,400 stipend for service as well as reimbursements for relocation, travel and health insurance. The fellowship will last one year.

References

Fellowships